The 2015–16 Taça da Liga de Futsal was the inaugural edition of the Taça da Liga de Futsal. The competition was disputed between 7 and 10 January 2016. For this edition, the 8 best ranked teams at the end of the regular phase first half of 2015–16 National League.
The games were played on Pavilhão Dr. Salvador Machado at Oliveira de Azeméis in a final-eight format.

Fixtures

Final
The final was played on 10 January at the Pavilhão Dr. Salvador Machado in Oliveira de Azeméis.

See also
Liga Portuguesa de Futsal
Taça de Portugal de Futsal

References

External links
fpf.pt

Taça da Liga de Futsal
Taca
Portugal